U.S. Route 77 (US-77) is a part of the U.S. Highway System that runs from the Veteran's International Bridge in Brownsville, Texas north to Interstate 29 (I-29) in Sioux City, Iowa. In the U.S. state of Kansas, US-77 is a main north–south highway that runs from the Oklahoma border north to the Nebraska border.

Route description
Between the US 40 junction and the Cowley County line is designated as a Blue Star Memorial Highway. In Cowley County, it is the Robert B. Docking Memorial Highway. Near Arkansas City it is the Walnut Valley Greenway.

From Nebraska to US 24 and from K-15 to Arkansas City, it is part of the National Highway System.

History

US-77 was established in Kansas by 1927.

The relocation of US-77 north of winfield was approved on November 14, 1980.

Major intersections

Related routes

Herington business loop

U.S. Route 77 Business (US-77 Bus.) was a short business loop through Herington, Kansas. US-77 Bus began at US-56 and US-77 south of Herington. US-77 Bus. ran north from here along with US-56 Bus. for 1.1 miles (1.8 km) then entered Herington. The highway then curved east and became Trapp Street. US-77 Bus. and US-56 Bus. then crossed Lime Creek then exited the city roughly  later. The two business routes then reached their eastern terminus at US-56 and US-77.

US-77 Bus. was approved to be decommissioned in a meeting on June 9, 1991, leaving just US-56 Bus..

Major intersections

Junction City business loop

U.S. Route 77 Business (US-77 Bus.) was a short business loop through Junction City, Kansas.

See also

References

External links

Kansas Department of Transportation State Map
KDOT: Historic State Maps

77
 Kansas
Transportation in Cowley County, Kansas
Transportation in Butler County, Kansas
Transportation in Marion County, Kansas
Transportation in Dickinson County, Kansas
Transportation in Morris County, Kansas
Transportation in Geary County, Kansas
Transportation in Riley County, Kansas
Transportation in Marshall County, Kansas